Matthaeus Erasmos, O.P. (1567–1627) was a Roman Catholic prelate who served as Archbishop of Nachitschewan (1607–1627).

Biography
Matthaeus Erasmos was born in 1567 and ordained a priest in the Order of Preachers.
On 22 October 1607, he was appointed during the papacy of Pope Paul V as Archbishop of Nachitschewan.
He served as Archbishop of Nachitschewan until his death on 9 July 1627.

References 

17th-century Roman Catholic bishops in the Ottoman Empire
Bishops appointed by Pope Paul V
1567 births
1627 deaths
Dominican bishops